Renata Carraretto (27 October 1923 – 29 December 2000) was an Italian alpine skier. She competed in three events at the 1948 Winter Olympics.

References

External links
 

1923 births
2000 deaths
Italian female alpine skiers
Olympic alpine skiers of Italy
Alpine skiers at the 1948 Winter Olympics
People from Cortina d'Ampezzo
Sportspeople from the Province of Belluno